Sarabhai vs Sarabhai is an Indian sitcom that ran on STAR One from 1 November 2004 to 16 April 2006 and on Hotstar from 15 May 2017 to 17 July 2017 for two seasons. The show was created by Jamnadas Majethia and Aatish Kapadia and directed by Deven Bhojani. Starring an ensemble cast of Satish Shah, Ratna Pathak Shah, Sumeet Raghavan, Rupali Ganguly, and Rajesh Kumar, the show revolves around a quintessential upper-class family living in the upmarket neighbourhood of Cuffe Parade in South Mumbai. The series was produced by Hats Off Productions. Regarded as being ahead of its generation in terms of its concept, writing, and average viewership ratings at the time of its initial release, the show has gone on to become a cult classic.

Premise
The show revolves around the life of an upper-class Gujarati family, the Sarabhais, who live in a luxury apartment building, and later in penthouses, in the upmarket neighbourhood of Cuffe Parade in South Mumbai. The family consists of Maya and Indravadhan Sarabhai, who have three children. Sahil, the eldest, lives in the apartment opposite them with his middle class wife Monisha. Sahil is a cosmetologist and is very composed as compared to the other characters. Monisha's middle-class habits irk Maya, a snooty and snobbish socialite. She constantly insults her with "light-hearted jokes" and attempts to correct her ways but in vain. Maya and Indravadhan's second child, Sonya, is a psychic, married to a technician Dushyant, who irritates the family by explaining everything about machines. His catchphrase is "I'll explain". The youngest child, Rosesh, is a poet and actor, whose poems are a constant source of comedy for the show. Indravadan loves to torture Rosesh and taunts his poetry, and him, for being his momma's puppet. He is unmarried and lives with his parents.

Supporting characters in the family include Indravadhan's sister Ila, and her deaf husband Madhusudan, whose catchphrase is "Hain?". Comedy and conflict ensue in the daily events happening in the Sarabhais' lives. Much of the humour in the show is derived from the shallow interactions among the city's elite and their perceived notions of the shortcomings and failings of middle-class society. It has a cult-like status among all the Indian sitcoms.

Characters

Sarabhai vs Sarabhai employs an ensemble cast. The show primarily focuses on the members of the Sarabhai family.

 Indravadhan Sarabhai: Satish Shah portrays Indravadhan Sarabhai a.k.a. Indu, who is an ex-director of a multinational company. He retired early to take care of the children and help Maya work as a social worker. He is always in conflict with his youngest son, Rosesh, he also jokes with Maya, pretending to hate her but actually loving her dearly as portrayed in various episodes. He constantly picks on Maya and Rosesh, always siding with Monisha in case of a tiff between her and Maya, and constantly tries to create conflicts between them. He notoriously ignites most of the quarrels in the family and then takes the seat in the audience, enjoying himself. He is irritated by his brother-in-law Madhusudan Bhai and his "hain?", as well as Dushyant, his son-in-law. He is the jester in the family.
 Maya Mazumdar Sarabhai: Ratna Pathak Shah portrays Maya Sarabhai, the female head of the Sarabhai family and runs the family like a pro. Being a snooty upper-class socialite, her daughter-in-law Monisha's middle-class money-saving techniques and unkempt behavior are constant pet peeves for Maya. Her catchphrase is "It's catastrophically middle class!", and she continually uses sarcasm to taunt Monisha and make her see the error of her ways. Whenever she taunts Monisha, depending on the intensity of the taunts, one to three bullet shots are heard in the background, increasing the humor in these situations and portraying her as a verbal bullet. She is constantly after Indravadhan to fix his dietary and cleanliness habits, not much unlike Monisha, and pampers her younger son Rosesh, also making sure he doesn't take a middle-class wife like Sahil. Her son-in-law Dushyant also irritates her by dropping in every time an appliance is damaged.
  Dr. Sahil Sarabhai: Sumeet Raghavan portrays Sahil Sarabhai, a cosmetologist. He is the eldest child, and arguably the most normal one in his otherwise eccentric family. He is soft, calm, wise and noble, and is constantly trying to resolve conflicts in his family, between Maya and Monisha, Maya and Indravadhan and Rosesh. He often gets sandwiched between his mother and his wife and tries not to hurt anyone. He avoids conflicts but loves making fun of his younger brother Rosesh, similar to Indravadhan.
 Manisha "Monisha" Singh Sarabhai: Rupali Ganguly portrays Monisha Sarabhai, a middle class, Punjabi girl from Noida and now the daughter-in-law of the Sarabhai’s. She rarely cleans the house and is always lazing around watching daily soaps on television. She develops a dramatic nature from these shows and always ends up saying threatening Sahil with leaving the house after every argument with Maya. Her passion is to save money, come what may. She is always at loggerheads with Maya for her thrifty ways. Her father-in-law always supports her, while Sahil is torn between the two. Despite being careless, Monisha is an honest, innocent, and loving woman. Manisha was named 'Monisha' by Maya as she found the name Manisha 'too middle-class'.
 Rosesh Sarabhai: Rajesh Kumar portrays Rosesh Sarabhai, the youngest child of Maya and Indravadhan. He is a theatre artist, an aspiring actor, and a so-called poet. He is Maya's favorite and she pampers him a lot. He wants to become an actor and his mother Maya supports him the most. Maya is the only member of the Sarabhai family who approves of and appreciates his absurd poetry and acting skills. He has a love-hate relationship with Indravadhan as he is always the target of his jokes and pranks. He always seconds his momma even if he doesn't feel like it. He has a peculiar and amusing voice, and his poems are always bad but funny.
 Sonia Sarabhai Painter : Kshitee Jog/Sheetal Thakkar portrays Sonia Sarabhai Painter. She is Dushyant's wife, Maya and Indravardhan's daughter, Sahil's younger and Rosesh's elder sister. She is a psychic.
 Dushyant Painter: Deven Bhojani portrays Dushyant Painter. He is Maya and Indravardhan's son-in-law. He is Maya and Indravardhan's daughter, Sonia's husband. He is a electrical engineer. He always explains about how gadgets work and always appears when a gadget isn’t working. His catchphrase is "I'll explain". He does not understand sarcasm which leads to humorous situations.
Madhusudan: Arvind Vaidya portrays Madhusudan, Indravardhan's brother-in-law, his elder sister Ila's husband. He is deaf and his catchphrase is "hain?"
Ila: Rita Bhaduri portrays Ila. She is Madhusudan's wife, and Indravardhan's elder sister. She helps other family members to communicate with Madhusudan.

Episodes

Season 1 

Being the season that gained this show its immense popularity among South Asian viewers, Season 1 aired in 2004. It revolves around the lives of the 5 main characters portraying conflicts in different contexts, revolving around the themes of family life and the upper-class of Mumbai. The season features a variety of supporting characters that intertwine with the lives of the main 5, for drama and comedic purposes. An overlaying plot (especially towards the end) is Rosesh's quest for a girl. Throughout the season, we meet different potential suitors, with extreme traits that clash with different members of the house. Other common plots are: Maya v/s Monisha conflicts in terms of her 'middle-class' behavior, and Sahil often finding himself stuck in the middle of this conflict. Indravadhan, Maya's husband is often found sparking these conflicts for his own enjoyment. Throughout the season, the characters experience different social and emotional 'adventures' delving into their relationships, conflicts, interactions, and history. In the final episode, the principal characters are seen stating that there would be another season of the series. On the Disney+ Hotstar streaming app, the episode where Rosesh published his poetry book is not available.

Season 2 (Sarabhai vs Sarabhai: Take 2)
After eleven years, the life of the Sarabhai family has not changed much. Now Monisha and Sahil have a seven-year-old son Aurnob a.k.a. Guddu and finally, Rosesh has found his love interest Jasmine Mavani also gaining the main role in a TV serial which he eventually loses. The family has moved to new penthouses. The season ended with Monisha asking for a divorce from Sahil, indicating a new season to come.

Production

Conception
Season 1
The show was produced by Jamnadas Majethia and Aatish Kapadia under the banner of Hatsoff Productions. The show was directed by Deven Bhojani along with Aatish Kapadia and the story and screenplay was also written by Aatish Kapadia. Sahil and Monisha are married and are living across Sahil's parents, Indravadhan and Maya Sarabhai, and Rosesh, their son, and Sahil's younger brother. Maya constantly taunts Monisha because of her behavior and language tone and constantly refers to her as "middle-class". Throughout the entire series, Sahil is kind of stuck between whether to take his wife's side or his mother's. Meanwhile, Indravadhan supports his daughter-in-law all the time. Rosesh, on the other side, is an actor who writes poetry that Sahil and Indravadhan dislike. Rosesh is a momma's boy and Maya's favorite child. Maya is a classy and sophisticated woman. The series goes through various events involving their lives.

 Season 2 (Sarabhai vs Sarabhai: Take 2)
During the finale of season 1, the cast of the series confirmed returning with a new season. However in 2012, Deven Bhojani denied that the series would return. The cast reunited in June 2016 over the belated 65th birthday party of Satish Shah, when the future of the show was discussed. The producer Jamnadas Majethia promised some good news for the fans. Later, the actors of the show confirmed the return of the new season as a web series entitled Sarabhai vs Sarabhai: Take 2. The series was picked up by Hotstar with the same cast, and the story is set after 11 years of the last season's conclusion.

Casting
Deven Bhojani made a debut as a director in the first season. He also played the recurring character of Dushyant Painter in the series.

Filming
The first season was shot on sets located at Kanjurmarg in suburban Mumbai. The cast were provided with their own rooms backstage with nameplates with each character's name for rehearsals and preparations.

Adaptations
Many of the characters in the Marathi series produced by Hats Off production as Madhuri Middle Class in 2014 on Star Pravah were inspired from Sarabhai, despite being a different story and character backgrounds. The show was unofficially adapted in Pakistan as Chana Jor Garam.

Broadcast
Season 1 was broadcast from 2004 to 2006 on STAR One. Reruns of the series also aired on sister channel Star Utsav. Season 2 was released on digital platform Hotstar from 15 May 2017 to 17 July 2017.

The show was telecast from 6 April 2020 on Star Bharat, as the production of the ongoing series had to be stopped by the channel due to the COVID-19 pandemic.

Reception

Critics and ratings

Season 1
Season 1 was a weekly television show and was closed after two years due to low TRPs. The newly-introduced stand-up comedy shows on the same network garnered TRPs as high as 9 while the Sarabhai received TRPs of as low as 0.63 during its inception. The highest rating it garnered during its original run time was 2 TVR. Only after the series started re-running episodes as a daily show multiple times, it became popular with a good viewership and response.

Hindustan Times appreciated the series, "Besides the concept that intrigued audiences of all age groups, the childlike accent of Rosesh Sarabhai (played by Rajesh Kumar) struck the right chord and became the ultimate trendsetter. Sarabhai vs Sarabhai turned the tables and gave each and every character equal screen space and importance.

Season 2
Season 2 was one among the most anticipated sitcom sequels. It opened to a positive response as well as negative being compared with season 1. Later, the show was heavily criticized for poor writing and sets, but the performances were praised.

While Arushi Jain from The Indian Express appreciated the initial episode of the series stating, "After watching the entire episode of the Sarabhai Vs Sarabhai Take 2 and the same madness that prevailed in the Sarabhai family seven years ago, we felt as if the characters have not changed a bit. Though some jokes were repeated still we are not complaining. The nostalgia of watching the funny banter between Indravardhan and Rosesh, and Maya Sarabhai on an anti-Monisha mission left us rolling on the floor laughing. It seems, some things just get better with age and Sarabhai vs Sarabhai definitely belongs to that category", while Sampada Sharma from the same criticised the series on comparison with season 1 as, "The show was updated, the sets were glamorous, but sadly, it did not even come close to creating the charm that the original show had. While the original was known for its quick wit, sharp dialogues and sassy performances, the new one did nothing but remind us of the good old days."

Impact
The show was unofficially adapted in Pakistan as Chana Jor Garam for which in December 2020 the makers and cast of Sarabhai condemned for violating the copyrights of the series and also criticised the series for spoiling the essence of Sarabhai.

Accolades
Season 1
The show won 5 Indian Telly Awards and Indian Television Academy Awards in 2005.
Indian Television Academy Awards 2005
 Best Serial, Comedy (Jury)
 Best Director, Comedy (Jury) – Deven Bhojani
 Best Actor, Comedy (Jury) – Satish Shah
 Best Actress, Comedy (Jury) – Ratna Pathak Shah
 Best Dialogues (Jury) – Aatish Kapadia

Indian Telly Awards 2005
 Best Serial (Comedy) 
 Best Director (Comedy) – Deven Bhojani
 Best Actor (Comedy) – Satish Shah
 Best Actress (Comedy) –  Ratna Pathak Shah
 Best Art Direction (Fiction) – Omung Kumar Bhandula

References

External links
 
 Hats Off Productions
 Sarabhai vs Sarabhai on Hotstar

 
2004 Indian television series debuts
Indian comedy television series
Indian television sitcoms
Television series about dysfunctional families
Television shows set in Mumbai
2010s Indian television series
Hats Off Productions